Zelva, also Zеĺva, is a town in Grodno Region, Belarus, and the administrative center of Zel’va district. It is situated by the Zelvyanka River.

History 
In 1921, 1344 inhabitants were Jews. During World War II, Zelva was occupied by Nazi Germany from 1 July 1941 until 12 July 1944 and administered as a part of Bezirk Bialystok. When the Germans entered the town, they killed 40 to 50 Jewish men and kept the Jews of the town imprisoned in a ghetto in very harsh conditions. In November 1942, the Jews were deported and murdered at the Treblinka extermination camp.

References 

Populated places in Grodno Region
Urban-type settlements in Belarus
Nowogródek Voivodeship (1507–1795)
Volkovyssky Uyezd
Białystok Voivodeship (1919–1939)
Holocaust locations in Belarus